Francisco Maximiliano de San Maxent La Roche (April 22, 1761 - November 25, 1825) was the interim governor of West Florida. He served four stints in the office of governor. He also commanded  the Spanish forces in Mobile  (1805-1807 and in 1811).

Biography 
Maximilien François de Saint-Maxent was born in New Orleans, Louisiana, to  Gilbert Antoine de St. Maxent and Elizabeth LaRoche. He was the fourth of nine siblings. 

Saint Maxent joined the Spanish army as a young man. He was appointed commandant of Mobile on 16 July 1805. In 1807, while commanding Mobile, he got into a dispute with American commander Edmund P. Gaines at Fort Stoddert. San Maxent was commandant of Mobile until 30 August 1807.  

In March 1809 he was appointed governor of Florida on an interim basis. He held the post for only two months and was removed in May of the same year. After a short period of governorship by Colonel Vicente Folch y Juan, Saint Maxent resumed the interim government of Florida in December 1809 and remained in office until October 1810. Shortly afterwards he returned to the post of commandant of Mobile, but he was replaced on 23 March 1811.

Just the following month Saint Maxent was appointed governor of Florida for the third time and he remained in office until June 1812. In September 1816, he was appointed governor of Florida for the fourth time. However, like the first time he governed Florida, he held the office for only two months, as he was removed from office in November of that year.

He died in Cuba in 1825.

Personal life and legacy 
San Maxent married Maria Irene Folch on 20 March 1805. Maria Irene Folch was daughter of Vicente Folch, who preceded him as governor.

Letters to and from him survive.

See also
List of colonial governors of Florida

References

 Governors of West Florida
People of Louisiana (New France)
People of Colonial Spanish Louisiana
Politicians from New Orleans